Louis Olivier Bancoult (born 1964) is a Chagossian activist who is the leader of the Chagos Refugee Group (CRG).

Biography
He was born in 1964 on the island of Peros Banhos in the Chagos Archipelago, from where he was forcibly removed at the age of 4 and transported to Mauritius. In response, his mother Rita Élysée Bancoult, together with activists Charlesia Alexis and Lisette Talate, founded the CRG in 1982.

Bancoult is an electrician and an advocate for the juridical right of the Chagossians to return from Mauritius to their original homeland. He has been involved in several high profile legal actions concerning the exile of the Chagos Islanders.

He was one of five islanders who, on 13 February 2022, stepped on to the beach of Peros Banhos, one of the larger atolls making up the disputed Chagos Islands, due to Mauritius legal victories "first at the UN General Assembly, then at the UN's International Court of Justice, and finally at the UN's tribunal for settling maritime disputes".

References

See also

 Chagos Archipelago sovereignty dispute
 Expulsion of the Chagossians
 R (on the application of Bancoult (No 2)) v Secretary of State for Foreign and Commonwealth Affairs

1964 births
Chagossian people
Living people
Mauritian activists
Chagos Archipelago sovereignty dispute
People exiled to Mauritius